is a former Japanese football player.

Playing career
Takehara was born in Hyogo Prefecture on November 16, 1974. After graduating from high school, he joined JEF United Ichihara in 1993. However he could not play at all in the match until 1994. On November 25, 1995, he debuted against Gamba Osaka at last match in 1995 season. In 1996, he moved to Japan Football League club Fukushima FC. However the club was disbanded end of 1997 season due to financial strain and he retired.

Club statistics

References

External links

1974 births
Living people
Association football people from Hyōgo Prefecture
Japanese footballers
J1 League players
Japan Football League (1992–1998) players
JEF United Chiba players
Fukushima FC players
Association football forwards